FK Omladinac (Serbian Cyrillic: ФК Oмлaдинaц Бaњa Лукa) is a football club from the neighborhood Lazarevo in the city of Banja Luka, in Republika Srpska, Bosnia and Herzegovina. The club used to compete in the First League of the Republika Srpska.

Notable former coaches
 Branimir Tulić
 Marko Milošević

External sources
 Club page at Soccerway.
 Club at RS-Sport.org.

Football clubs in Republika Srpska
Football clubs in Bosnia and Herzegovina
Sport in Banja Luka